The EuroSport Crossover is an electrically powered two seat motor glider and ultralight aircraft designed and built in Portugal.

Design and development

The Crossover has a largely epoxy resin and carbon fibre structure. The wingtips have tall, narrow winglets. The  trailing edge of the inner section is filled by two-section, double slotted, electrically driven Fowler flaps, with ailerons on the outer panels.

The fuselage is rounded in cross-section, with a long, low, forward-hinged and electrically operated canopy over the two side-by-side seats, which are provided with dual controls.  Behind the wing the fuselage tapers to a T-tail.  The fin is swept and straight-edged and the rudder is straight-edged, electrically trimmed and vertical. A straight tapered tailplane has a single, electrically powered elevator. The Crossover has a fuselage-mounted tricycle undercarriage. All wheels are the same size and retract forwards; the mainwheels have brakes and the nosewheel is steerable.

Power is supplied  by two three-phase electric motors, each capable of providing  for take-off and  continuously, controlled together by a single throttle lever.  These are mounted in the fuselage, with the four lithium batteries, storing a total energy of 36 kWh, just behind the cockpit at the centre of gravity. Several different propeller configurations have been considered, including a single nose-mounted propeller or a single propeller mounted near the top of the vertical tail. The initial trials were made with twin, contra-rotating propellers on arms that fold forward out of the fuselage just behind the wing trailing edge. Doors ensure that the fuselage is aerodynamically clean with or without the deployment of the propellers.

The Crossover began its flight testing with short hops on 23 July 2013. Tests of the fin-mounted propeller configuration began with taxying runs on 12 November that year.

Variants
Long span wing Motor glider with  span.
Short span version Ultralight glider with  span.
Variable span Proposed in-flight telescopically-variable span wing.

Specifications (9.60 m span)

References

Motor gliders
Electric aircraft
2010s Portuguese civil aircraft
2010s Portuguese ultralight aircraft